Vasily Grigorievich Khudyakov (Russian: Василий Григорьевич Худяков; 24 December 1825, Akshuat, Ulyanovsk Oblast - 26 July 1871, Saint Petersburg) was a Russian history, portrait and genre painter.

Biography 

He began his studies at the Stroganov Moscow State University of Arts and Industry, then spent almost two years at the Moscow School of Painting, Sculpture and Architecture (MSPSA). His mentor there was Professor , who invited him to be an assistant for decorative work that was being done in the entrance hall of Kremlin Palace. Some of his paintings were shown at the Imperial Academy of Arts, where they received a silver medal.
 
In 1848, he went to Saint Petersburg and audited classes at the Academy. In his rush to be named a "Free Artist", he accepted a silver medal and passed up the opportunity to compete for a gold one. After that, he mostly painted portraits on commission. In 1851, upon completing one of Dean Avraam Melnikov, he was named an "Academician".

Among other notable works at this time were "Finnish Smugglers", one of the first two works purchased by Pavel Tretyakov for his gallery, and "Persecution of Christians in the East", purchased by Tsar Nicholas I as a gift to King Otto of Greece.

In 1856, he visited France and Italy; staying in Paris, Rome and Naples for about four years while continuing to execute commissions for members of the Russian nobility. On the basis of these works, he was named a Professor by the Academy in 1860. After returning, he became a teacher at the MSPSA. In 1862, he moved to Saint Petersburg, where he continued to exhibit frequently. He died of cholera in 1871.

Selected paintings

References

External links 

1825 births
1871 deaths
19th-century painters from the Russian Empire
Russian male painters
Russian portrait painters
History painters
Artists from Moscow
Russian genre painters
Deaths from cholera
Tretyakov Gallery
19th-century male artists from the Russian Empire
Moscow School of Painting, Sculpture and Architecture alumni
Stroganov Moscow State Academy of Arts and Industry alumni